Lisa Henni (born 19 September 1982) is a Swedish actress. She was educated in London at the Mountview Academy of Theatre Arts. In 2010, she made her debut in the critically acclaimed Swedish movie Easy Money, playing the lead female role of Sophie.

In 2017, she played police detective Sophie Borg in SVT's police comedy drama series Fallet.

Filmography

Film

Television

References

External links 

1982 births
Living people
Swedish film actresses